Κambarnatham is a village in Ammapettai revenue block, Papanasam taluk,  Thanjavur district of Tamil Nadu. It is one of the 46 panchayat villages in that revenue block.

Demographics
According to 2011 census report, the village has 620 households with the total population of 2536 persons of which 1249 are male and 1287 are female.

Literacy rate 
The literacy rate of the village is just 63%.1614 out of 2536 are literates here . The male literacy rate is 71% and the female literacy rate is 55%.

References

Villages in Thanjavur district